Nicolás Agustín Gómez (born 3 December 1992) is an Argentine footballer who plays as a midfielder for Club Comunicaciones.

Career
Gómez's career started with River Plate. He represented them at the 2012 U-20 Copa Libertadores in Peru, which they won with Gómez appearing five times and scoring once; versus Corinthians. Gómez made his senior debut in April 2013, featuring for thirty-seven minutes of a Copa Argentina defeat to Primera B Metropolitana's Estudiantes (BA). He subsequently appeared on their substitutes bench for four fixtures in the 2012–13 Argentine Primera División season. In January 2015, Gómez completed a loan move to Barracas Central. His bow came on 11 April versus Almagro, which one of three games for the club.

In 2016, Gómez joined Güemes of Torneo Federal A. Ten appearances followed, along with relegation to Torneo Federal B; where he played sixteen times and netted three goals. A stint with Deportivo Paraguayo then occurred, prior to the midfielder signing with San Jorge. He was sent off during his debut, receiving a straight red card after sixty-three minutes of a win away to Concepción. Having participated in nine matches across two campaigns with San Jorge, Gómez departed to fellow Torneo Federal A outfit Estudiantes on 24 July 2018.

Career statistics
.

References

External links

1992 births
Living people
People from Santiago del Estero
Argentine footballers
Association football midfielders
Primera B Metropolitana players
Torneo Federal A players
Torneo Argentino A players
Torneo Argentino B players
Primera D Metropolitana players
Club Atlético River Plate footballers
Barracas Central players
Deportivo Paraguayo footballers
San Jorge de Tucumán footballers
Club Cipolletti footballers
Estudiantes de Río Cuarto footballers
Club Comunicaciones footballers
Sportspeople from Santiago del Estero Province